Eta Pyxidis (η Pyxidis) is a solitary, white-hued star in the southern constellation of Pyxis. It is faintly visible to the naked eye with an apparent visual magnitude of +5.27. Based upon an annual parallax shift of 14.07 mas as seen from Earth, this star is located around 232 light years from the Sun. At that distance, the visual magnitude of the star is diminished by an extinction factor of 0.07 due to interstellar dust.

This is an A-type main-sequence star with a stellar classification of A0 V. It is young with an age of around 67 million years and is spinning rapidly with a projected rotational velocity of 238 km/s. The star has 2.51 times the mass of the Sun and is radiating 42 times the Sun's luminosity from its photosphere at an effective temperature of around 11,614 K.

References

A-type main-sequence stars
Pyxidis, Eta
Pyxis (constellation)
Durchmusterung objects
073495
042334
3420